Mitja Margon (born 28 September 1971) is a Slovenian sailor. He competed at the 1996 Summer Olympics and the 2000 Summer Olympics.

References

External links
 

1971 births
Living people
Slovenian male sailors (sport)
Olympic sailors of Slovenia
Sailors at the 1996 Summer Olympics – 470
Sailors at the 2000 Summer Olympics – 470
People from Piran
20th-century Slovenian people